Blepharomyia angustifrons is a species of fly in the family Tachinidae.

Distribution
Austria, Czech Republic, Germany, Netherlands, Poland, Slovakia, Sweden and Switzerland

References

Diptera of Europe
Dexiinae
Insects described in 1971